Okka means various things:

 For the Ottoman unit of weight, see Oka (measure)
 For the water-pipe, see Hookah

It might also refer to:

 Okka Rau (born 1977), German beach volleyball player
 Okka Disk, an American jazz record label